Ladyhawk may refer to:

 Ladyhawk (band), a Canadian indie rock band
 Ladyhawk (album), their 2006 studio album
 Ladyhawk (comics), two fictional characters in the Marvel Comics' series Spider-Girl
 "Ladyhawk", a 2019 song by Yanni

See also
 Ladyhawke (disambiguation)